The House Opposite is a 1931 mystery crime novel by the British writer Joseph Jefferson Farjeon. It was the second in his series of novels featuring Detective Ben, following the 1926 novel Number 17. It was published by the Collins Crime Club which had been established the previous year.

Film adaptation
It was made into a 1932 British film of the same title directed by Walter Summers and starring Henry Kendall and  Frank Stanmore. It was produced by British International Pictures who also released Number Seventeen a version of the first novel in the series, directed by Alfred Hitchcock.

References

Bibliography
 Goble, Alan. The Complete Index to Literary Sources in Film. Walter de Gruyter, 1999.
 Hubin, Allen J. Crime Fiction, 1749-1980: A Comprehensive Bibliography. Garland Publishing, 1984.

1931 British novels
Novels by Joseph Jefferson Farjeon
British thriller novels
British mystery novels
British crime novels
British detective novels
British novels adapted into films
Novels set in London
Collins Crime Club books